According to an American political conspiracy theory, the deep state is a clandestine network of members of the federal government (especially within the FBI and CIA), working in conjunction with high-level financial and industrial entities and leaders, to exercise power alongside or within the elected United States government. The term deep state originated in the 1990s as a reference to an alleged longtime deep state in Turkey, but began to be used to refer to the American government as well, including during the Obama administration. However, the theory reached mainstream recognition under the presidency of Donald Trump, who referenced an alleged deep state working against him and his administration's agenda.

The term has precedents since at least the 1950s, including the concept of the military–industrial complex (more popular among the political left than "deep state"), which posits a cabal of generals and defense contractors who enrich themselves through pushing the country into endless wars.

Opinion polling done in 2017 and 2018 suggests that approximately half of all Americans believe in the existence of a deep state.

Prevalence 
Although the term 'deep state' is thought to have originated in Turkey in the 1990s, belief in the concept of a deep state has been present in the United States since at least the 1950s. A 1955 article in the Bulletin of the Atomic Scientists, quotes Americans sharing their belief in the existence of a "dual state": a hidden national security hierarchy and shadow government that monitors and controls elected politicians.

Usage by journalists and academics 
Political scientist George Friedman alleges that such a deep state has existed since 1871, when the president's power over federal employees was restricted.

Historian Alfred W. McCoy argued that the increase in the power of the United States Intelligence Community since the September 11 attacks "has built a fourth branch of the U.S. government" that is "in many ways autonomous from the executive, and increasingly so".

Tufts University professor Michael J. Glennon stated that President Barack Obama did not succeed in resisting or changing what he calls the "double government" and points to Obama's failure to close Guantanamo Bay detention camp, a major campaign promise, as evidence of the existence of a deep state.

In a 2017 interview several weeks before Trump was inaugurated, Senate Democratic Leader Chuck Schumer called Trump "really dumb" for having repeatedly criticized the CIA, saying, "Let me tell you, you take on the intelligence community, they have six ways from Sunday at getting back at you." Various commentators, as well as the ACLU, have pointed to this statement as evidence for the existence of a deep state.

Rebecca Gordon, a teacher and author at the University of San Francisco, wrote in a 2020 piece for Business Insider that Trump has used the term "deep state" to refer to the U.S. government, in particular government Institutions that "frustrate" him, as well as block or fail to implement his government policy such as courts, the Justice Department, and the news media.

Usage by public figures 
In 2014, former Congressional staffer Mike Lofgren alleged that there was a deep state protecting "powerful vested interests" and that a "web of entrenched interests in the US government and beyond ... dictate America’s defense decisions, trade policies and priorities with little regard for the actual interests or desires of the American people".

In 2017, former Democratic U.S. Representative Dennis Kucinich alleged that there were individuals in the intelligence community attempting to sabotage relations between the United States and Russia.

Some commentators, such as former NSA leaker Edward Snowden, allege that there is a deep state made up of civil servants.

Usage by Trump and allies 
During his presidency, Donald Trump and his strategists alleged that the deep state was interfering with his agenda and that the United States Department of Justice was part of the deep state because it did not prosecute Huma Abedin or James Comey. Some Trump allies and right-wing media outlets alleged that Obama was coordinating a deep state resistance to Trump. President Trump's supporters used deep state to refer to allegations that intelligence officers and executive branch officials were influencing policy via leaks or other internal means.

In 2018, Newt Gingrich alleged that Robert Mueller was part of the deep state for the Special Counsel investigation into Russian interference in the 2016 United States elections.

In 2018, The New York Times published an anonymous op-ed by DHS chief of staff Miles Taylor titled "I Am Part of the Resistance Inside the Trump Administration", attributed at the time to a "senior official in the Trump Administration". In the essay, Taylor was critical of President Trump and claimed "that many of the senior officials in [Trump's] own administration are working diligently from within to frustrate parts of his agenda and his worst inclinations". House Minority Leader Kevin McCarthy described this as evidence of the deep state at work, and David Bossie wrote an op-ed at Fox News saying this was the deep state "working against the will of the American people".

In 2018, Republican U.S. Senator Rand Paul alleged that the CIA only briefing the "Gang of Eight" on sensitive intelligence issues was an example of the deep state.

In 2020, Trump cabinet member and acting White House Chief of Staff Mick Mulvaney alleged that claims of a deep state working against Trump were "absolutely, 100% true".

Criticism 
Critics of Trump's use of the term 'deep state' maintain that it is a conspiracy theory with no basis in reality.

UCLA School of Law professor Jon D. Michaels argued that compared with developing governments such as Egypt, Pakistan, and Turkey, governmental power structures in the United States are "almost entirely transparent". Michaels argues that the American 'deep state', which includes federal agencies responsible for regulation, welfare, crime prevention, and defense, and the employees who operate them, fundamentally differs from Trump's use of the term in five important respects:
Not Elitist – In the US, bureaucrats come from a diverse range of socio-economic backgrounds, especially when compared to those in the Middle East, and even Western Europe.
Not Shadowy – American agencies are generally "transparent and accessible" , in comparison to those of the Middle East, Asia, and Europe.
Not Monolithic – the American deep state is "internally diverse and fragmented."
A Bulwark, Not a Battering Ram – actions of civil servants in the US are inherently defensive, not proactive.
Not an Extraconstitutional Force – the bureaucracy should be seen as part of the constitutional system of checks and balances in the US, which often serves as a final check on presidential or agency overreach.
 
Critics warned that use of the term in the United States could undermine public confidence in institutions and be used to justify suppression of dissent.

Political commentator and former presidential adviser David Gergen said that the term had been appropriated by Steve Bannon, Breitbart News, and other supporters of the Trump administration in order to delegitimize the critics of the presidency.

Stephen Walt, professor of international relations at Harvard University, argued that there is no deep state and that "to the extent that there is a bipartisan foreign-policy elite, it is hiding in plain sight".

Anthropologist C. August Elliott likened military involvement in the Trump administration as a "shallow state" in which they were forced to guide the administration "away from a potential shipwreck".

Linguist Geoffrey Nunberg said that deep state is an "elastic label" in that "its story conforms to the intricate grammar of those conspiracy narratives", referencing the transition of conservative rhetoric regarding "big government" from "meddlesome bunglers" to "conniving ideologues".

Fox News panelist Charles Krauthammer called the idea ridiculous, arguing that bureaucracy exists in the United States government rather than a government-wide conspiracy.

Polling 
According to an ABC NEWS/Washington Post poll of Americans in April 2017, about half (48%) thought there was a deep state, defined as "military, intelligence and government officials who try to secretly manipulate government", while about a third (35%) of all participants thought it was a false conspiracy theory, and the remainder (17%) had no opinion. Of those who believe a deep state exists, more than half (58%) said it was a major problem, a net of 28% of those surveyed.

A March 2018 poll by Monmouth University found most respondents (63%) were unfamiliar with deep state but a majority believe that a deep state likely exists in the United States when described as "a group of unelected government and military officials who secretly manipulate or direct national policy". Three-fourths (74%) of the respondents say that they believe this type of group probably (47%) or definitely (27%) exists in the federal government.

An October 2019 The Economist/YouGov poll found that, without giving a definition of deep state to respondents, 70% of Republicans, 38% of independents, and 13% of Democrats agreed that a deep state was "trying to overthrow Trump".

Closely related concepts
In his 2015 book The State: Past, Present, Future, academic Bob Jessop comments on the similarity of three constructs:
 "Deep state", for which he cites Mike Lofgren's 2014 definition: "a hybrid association of elements of government and parts of top-level finance and industry that is effectively able to govern ... without reference to the consent of the governed as expressed through the formal political process".
 "Dark state" – "networks of officials, private firms, media outlets, think tanks, foundations, NGOs, interest groups, and other forces that attend to the needs of capital, not of everyday life" while "concealed from public gaze" or "hidden in plain sight", citing political scientist Jason Lindsay's 2013 article.
 "The Fourth Branch' of U.S. government" – consisting of "an ever more unchecked and unaccountable centre ..., working behind a veil of secrecy", citing Tom Engelhardt's 2014 book.

Deep state has been associated with the "military–industrial complex" by author Mike Lofgren, who has identified this complex as the private part of the deep state. University professor and journalist Marc Ambinder has suggested that a myth about the deep state is that it functions as one entity; in reality, he states "the deep state contains multitudes, and they are often at odds with one another".

See also 
 Cabal
 Civil service
 Dual power
 Fifth column
 Illiberal democracy
 Parallel state
 Power behind the throne
 Shadow government (conspiracy theory)
 Smoke-filled room

References

Further reading 

Conspiracy theories in the United States
Conspiracy theories promoted by Donald Trump
Corruption in the United States
Deep politics
Political terminology of the United States
Political geography
Politics of the United States